This is a list of Spanish television related events in 2005.

Events 
 14 June: Spanish Parliament passes Act 10/2005, regarding Digital terrestrial television and Cable television.
 5 September: IB3, Regional TV Channel of the Balearic Islands starts broadcasting.
 7 November: Nationwide TV Channel Cuatro, starts broadcasting.
 26 November: Antonio José Sánchez Mazuecos ranks 2nd in the Junior Eurovision Song Contest 2005, hold in Hasselt (Belgium.
 20 December: Regional Channel Televisión del Principado de Asturias starts broadcasting.

Debuts

Television shows

Ending this year

Changes of network affiliation

Foreign series debuts in Spain

Deaths 
 16 January - Agustín González, actor, 74.
 27 March - Fernando Jiménez del Oso, host, 63.
 28 March - Joaquín Luqui, journalist and music critic, 57.
 21 April - Valeriano Andrés, actor, 82.
 6 June - Manuel Codeso], actor, 79.
 13 June - Sebastián Junyent, director, 57.
 3 August - Luis Barbero, actor, 88.
 9 September - Rafael Escamilla, host, 66.
 9 December - Enrique Rubio, host, 85.

See also
2005 in Spain
List of Spanish films of 2005

References 

2005 in Spanish television